Elizabeth Faulkner Baker (10 December 1885 – 30 January 1973) was an American economist and academic who specialized in scientific management and the relationship between employment and technological change, especially the role of women.

Personal life and education
Baker was born of New England parents in Abilene, Kansas, on 10 December 1885 and served as dean of women and instructor in economics at Lewiston State Normal School (1915–17) and then dean of women at Ellensburg State Normal School (1917–18) while earning her Bachelor of Laws degree from the University of California in 1918. She received her M.A. in economics from Columbia University in 1919 and her Ph.D. in economics from the same university in 1925 while teaching at Barnard College.

Career
Baker remained at Barnard for the rest of her career, serving as chair of the Department of Economics from 1940 until her retirement in 1952. During World War II, she served as a hearing officer for the National War Labor Board. She joined the Taylor Society, a group dedicated to the ideas of scientific management as espoused by Frederick Winslow Taylor, in the late 1920s and Baker was director of its New York section in 1944–46.

Notes

References

1885 births
1973 deaths
Economists from Kansas
American women economists
University of California alumni
Barnard College faculty
Columbia Graduate School of Arts and Sciences alumni
Scientists from New York City
Economists from New York (state)
20th-century American economists
20th-century American women